Michael Gynn (born 19 August 1961) is an English former footballer who played as a midfielder in the Football League for Peterborough United, Coventry City and Stoke City.

Career
Gynn began his career with his hometown club, Peterborough United, where he scored 39 goals from 188 appearances in all competitions, before joining First Division club Coventry City for a fee of £60,000. He spent ten years and accumulated almost 300 appearances at the club, with whom he won the FA Cup in 1987.

Gynn then moved on to Stoke City in August 1993 where he played in 29 matches in the 1993–94 season before retiring. He became a postman in the Coventry area, and works as a match statistician for the Press Association. In 2005, Gynn held his testimonial match at Coventry City's former ground of Highfield Road, the penultimate game played there before its demolition.

Career statistics
Source:

A.  The "Other" column constitutes appearances and goals in the Anglo-Italian Cup, FA Charity Shield, Football League Group Cup, Football League Trophy and Full Members Cup.

Honours
 Coventry City
 FA Cup winner: 1987

References

External links
 

1961 births
Living people
Sportspeople from Peterborough
English footballers
Association football midfielders
Peterborough United F.C. players
Coventry City F.C. players
Stoke City F.C. players
Hednesford Town F.C. players
Wisbech Town F.C. players
English Football League players
Premier League players
FA Cup Final players